Specklinia blancoi is a species of orchid plant native to Costa Rica.

References 

blancoi
Flora of Costa Rica
Plants described in 2000